The World Rally Championship (WRC) is a rallying series administrated by Fédération Internationale de l'Automobile (FIA), motorsport's world governing body.  The WRC was first contested in 1973 though only awarded championship titles to manufacturers to begin with. In 1977 the FIA Cup for Drivers began before being replaced in 1979 with the World Rally Championship for Drivers. There is no official FIA online publication of co-driver champions or when the title was introduced, but according to the printed FIA Yearbooks of Automobile Sport (the official FIA archives of motorsport), the first recorded co-driver world title was awarded in 1982 to Christian Geistdörfer who ran with the driver champion Walter Röhrl that year. The archives of WRC.com had recorded co-driver world champions from 2001, however this page is no longer maintained by WRC.com. eWRC-Results.com, a popular rally results archive has co-driver standings from 1998 onwards on its 'Seasons' pages. The website Juwra.com holds a record of WRC sporting regulations from 2004 and there are references at least to a co-driver championship title from that year. Because of this lack of forthcoming information from either of the official sources FIA or WRC it is not unusual to see conflicting information about who is a champion or not. For example, Nicky Grist may mistakenly be called a co-driver champion for sitting with driver champion Juha Kankkunnen in 1993, however he did not do all the rallies and was outscored by Daniel Grataloup, the official co-driver champion as recorded by the FIA Yearbooks. Some co-drivers may be called champions in years prior to 1982 too, technically speaking they are celebrated as such unofficially. The list below includes these co-drivers, using point scoring systems copied from the drivers championship (or cup from 1977 to 1978).

The driver's and co-driver's championships are separate championships but follow the same structure for accruing points. Since 2010 points are awarded at the end of each rally to the top ten WRC (overall) drivers and co-drivers that qualify as follows: 25, 18, 15, 12, 10, 8, 6, 4, 2, 1. In addition to those points, from 2011 each event holds 1 special stage, the Power Stage, in which drivers and co-drivers can score extra points – currently awarded to five fastest (5, 4, 3, 2, 1). In previous years the points awarded for overall classification has ranged from between 9 and 25 points for a win and having points awarded to the top 6, 8, 10 or even 15 crews. This makes comparing results across years difficult.

Daniel Elena holds the record for the most co-drivers' championships, winning nine during his career. He also holds the record for the most championships won in a row; he won nine consecutive titles from 2004 to 2012. Julien Ingrassia is second, with eight championships won between 2013 and 2021.

List of co-drivers' champions

By year

By co-driver

By nationality

See also 

 List of World Rally Championship Driver's champions
 List of World Rally Championship Constructors' champions
 List of World Rally Championship records

References

External links
 World Rally Championship official site
 FIA official site
 eWRC-Results rally results archive

World Rally Championship Drivers' Champions
rally
Rally,